Crook by da Book: The Fed Story is the fourth studio album by American rapper Project Pat. First rumored to be released August 18, 2006, but was pushed back to December 5, 2006. Recording sessions took place at Hypnotize Minds Studio in Memphis, Tennessee. Production was handled by DJ Paul and Juicy J. The album features guest appearances from Three 6 Mafia, Beanie Sigel, Lyfe Jennings, Pimp C, Mr. Bigg and Young Jeezy. The album debuted at number 64 on the Billboard 200, selling about 40,000 copies in its first week.

Critical reception 

AllMusic's David Jeffries called the album "a properly financed version of his Ghetty Green LP with beefier beats and more polished production" but noted that its appeal will depend on "the listener's tolerance for his tried-and-true, down-and-dirty formula", concluding that: "[T]he single-minded Crook by da Book might not woo many newcomers toward his hard-thugging corner of the hip-hop world, but Hypnotize Minds fans worried a Oscar would make this family go soft can now exhale." Steve 'Flash' Juon of RapReviews praised Pat for being "a competent narrator and storyteller" that has the main focus on his own album and uses the spotlight effectively for his featured guests, concluding that:  "Crook by Da Book: The Fed Story is a study in contradictions, as Pat seems like a rapper who is capable of being more than a fill-in member for Three 6 Mafia but one who is also clearly loyal to his Memphis comrades and vice versa. They are more help than hindrance to his rap career, so this is not at all a bad match; in fact future Three 6 Mafia albums are likely to be improved by his having an increased role on the tracks lyrically."

Track listing

Charts

Weekly charts

Year-end charts

References

External links

2006 albums
Project Pat albums
Columbia Records albums
Albums produced by DJ Paul
Albums produced by Juicy J